Richard Cannon (September, 1909 – February 3, 1935), nicknamed "Speedball", was an American Negro league pitcher from 1928 to 1932.

A native of Mount Vernon, Indiana, Cannon made his Negro leagues debut in 1928 with the St. Louis Stars. He played for St. Louis again the following season, then spent 1930 and 1931 with the Louisville Black Caps and Cleveland Cubs. Cannon died in Louisville, Kentucky in 1935 at age 25.

References

External links
 and Seamheads

1909 births
1935 deaths
Date of birth missing
Birmingham Black Barons players
Cleveland Cubs players
Louisville Black Caps players
Nashville Elite Giants players
St. Louis Stars (baseball) players
Baseball pitchers
Baseball players from Indiana
People from Mount Vernon, Indiana
20th-century African-American sportspeople